The 1971 European Junior Badminton Championships was the second edition of the European Junior Badminton Championships. It was held in Gottwaldov, Czechoslovakia, in the month of April. Danish players won both the Girls' singles and doubles while England won Boys' doubles and Mixed doubles. Netherlands' Ridder won Boys' singles title.

Medalists

Medal table

Results

Semi-finals

Finals

References 

European Junior Badminton Championships
European Junior Badminton Championships
European Junior Badminton Championships
European Junior Badminton Championships
International sports competitions hosted by Czechoslovakia